The inshore hagfish (Eptatretus burgeri) is a hagfish found in the Northwest Pacific, from the Sea of Japan and across eastern Japan to Taiwan. It has six pairs of gill pouches and gill apertures.  These hagfish are found in the sublittoral zone.  They live usually buried in the bottom mud and migrate into deeper water to spawn.
The inshore hagfish is the only member of the Myxinidae family having a seasonal reproductive cycle.

Generally very little is known about hagfish reproduction and embryos are difficult to obtain for study, although laboratory breeding of Eptatretus burgeri has succeeded.

The hide of this hagfish is processed into "eel skin" in Korea and exported worldwide.

As food

In most countries hagfish are usually not eaten, but this particular species is valued as food in the Korean Peninsula and among the Koreans in Japan. It is also enjoyed by Japanese as a local delicacy in some regions, particularly Nagasaki and Niigata Prefectures. It is known as bùshì nián mángmán and púshì nián mángmán among other names in Mandarin Chinese, kkomjangeo or meokjangeo in Korean, and nuta-unagi in Japanese.

As with all hagfish, the inshore hagfish produces slime when agitated. This is obtained by placing a live inshore hagfish into a container and knocking the container with a stick.

References

External links

P. Ekanayake, Y. D. Lee & J. Lee Antioxidant Activity of Flesh and Skin of Eptatretus Burgeri (Hag Fish)
 

Myxinidae
Marine fauna of East Asia
Fish described in 1855